Cliff Hysell (c. 1942 – October 26, 2014) was an American football player and coach.  He served as the head football coach at Montana State University from 1992 to 1999, compiling a record of 42–46.  Hysell died at the age of 72 at his home in Bozeman, Montana on October 26, 2014.

Head coaching record

College

References

Year of birth missing
1940s births
2014 deaths
Fresno State Bulldogs football coaches
Montana State Bobcats football coaches
Montana State Bobcats football players
Utah Utes football players
High school football coaches in Montana